Modena Park is a neighborhood in Northeast Philadelphia.  It is located east of Northeast Philadelphia Airport at Morrell Avenue. 

The ground was owned by the estate of William Dudley in 1910. The neighborhood was built in 1963, and features short blocks of two-story rowhouses with basements. This neighborhood borders Morrell Park to its south. Parkwood, Philadelphia, Pennsylvania to its north. Walton Run woods to the west, and Millbrook, Philadelphia, Pennsylvania, to its east.

Education
Public-

General Harry LaBrum Middle School
10858 Hawley Rd, Philadelphia, PA 19154

Philadelphia Archdiocese-

Archbishop Ryan High School
11260 Academy Rd, Philadelphia, PA, 19154

St. Martha's School
11452 Academy Rd, Philadelphia, PA,

Recreation
Picariello Playground
10811 Calera Rd, Philadelphia, PA 19154

Liberty Bell Youth Organization
Red Lion & Calera Rds Road, Philadelphia, PA 19114

Philadelphia Soccer Club
10402 Decatur Road, Philadelphia, PA 19154

References 

Neighborhoods in Philadelphia
Northeast Philadelphia